Bucovăț is a commune in Dolj County, Oltenia, Romania with a population of  4,224  people. It is composed of seven villages: Bucovăț, Cârligei, Italieni, Leamna de Jos, Leamna de Sus, Palilula and Sărbătoarea.

Italieni village, founded by Italian settlers, was destroyed during the systematization process of the 1980s.

References

Communes in Dolj County
Localities in Oltenia

nl:Bucovăţ
ro:Bucovăţ, Dolj